The Outlaw 26 is an American sailboat that was designed by Philip Rhodes as a cruiser  and first built in 1965.

Production
The design was built by O'Day Corp. in the United States between 1965 and 1968, with 80 examples completed.

After production had been completed the molds for the Outlaw 26 design were sold to Northern Yachts of Ajax, Ontario, Canada. The design was developed into the Northern 25 in 1970, with the addition of a fin keel and a taller cabin.

Design
The Outlaw 26 is a recreational keelboat, built predominantly of fiberglass, with wood trim. It has a masthead sloop rig, a spooned raked stem, a raised transom, a keel- mounted rudder controlled by a tiller and a fixed long keel. It displaces  and carries  of ballast.

A tall rig version was available, with a mast about  higher than standard for locations with lighter average winds.

The boat is normally fitted with a small outboard motor in a transom well, for docking and maneuvering.

See also
List of sailing boat types

Related development
Northern 25

Similar sailboats
Beneteau First 26
Beneteau First 265
C&C 26
C&C 26 Wave
Cal 2-25
Contessa 26
Dawson 26
Discovery 7.9
Grampian 26
Herreshoff H-26
Hunter 26
Hunter 260
Hunter 270
MacGregor 26
Mirage 26
Nash 26
Nonsuch 26
Paceship PY 26
Pearson 26
Parker Dawson 26
Sandstream 26
Tanzer 26
Yamaha 26

References

Keelboats
1960s sailboat type designs
Sailing yachts
Sailboat types built by O'Day Corp.
Sailboat type designs by Philip Rhodes